Bradt is a surname. Notable people with the surname include:

Albert Andriessen Bradt (c. 1607 – 1686), Norwegian settler
George Bradt (born 1958), American businessman
Gordon Bradt (1924–2022), American inventor, designer and founder of Kinetico Studios
Hilary Bradt (born 1941), English travel writer and founder of Bradt Travel Guides
Paul Bradt (1904–1978), American rock climber
Richard C. Bradt (1938–2019), American materials engineer
Tyler Bradt (born 1982), American kayaker